The Ovia-Osese Festival is a yearly celebrated festival by the Ogori's. This town is located in the Ogori-Magongo local government area of Kogi state, Nigeria. They share boundaries with Edo state and the Yoruba's. The town holds the Ovia-Osese festival annually to initiate young girls within 15 and above into adulthood or so called womanhood. This initiation is done for young girls who has maintained and kept themselves over the years and that are still virgins. The rite is done so as to promote the quality of purity, sanctity, abstinence, and the untouched physical and emotional state of young girls. This celebration encourages the younger growing ones to keep themselves from pre-marital affairs.

History 
Back in the 1870s, each family of  the Ogori community has a culture of initiating their daughters having clocked adulthood. During this stage the family prepare the female gender that is ripe for marriage on how to plan a home, cook and do the female activities. Later on, the family culture was adopted to be a community culture and is practised yearly as a festival to celebrate young girls having reaching adulthood and also, have kept themselves, this act  has helped the community young girls in taking extra measures to keep themselves so as to be celebrated during the festival. This festival is also a eye opener for men seeking a wife to come and eye-pick the woman they love likewise, men who are shy or weak in proposing, expressing or making advances towards the female gender to open up.

Festivity 
The Ogori's festival which has continuously been passing the message of self-restrain and sexual discipline among young girls has been the reason for is international recognition and the rich culture has placed it on the world map. During the festival, the young girls (called ibusuke) and the maiden (Ivia) 'perform traditional dance to entertain the community and visitors who came for the festival, during the dance performance, lots of noise and gesture are awarded to them as the young men also shines their eyes in search of their missing ribs. The young girls perform the dance as they are dressed in their traditional attires rapped around there chest with beads on their necks and wrist. Their movements, songs, facial expression showcases the festival's colour. Also, the festival is not only limited to the dancing and initiation but also features: cooking competition, talent hunt, free health programme, sporting events, school debate and quiz, and also beauty pageant and more.

References 

Festivals in Nigeria